Wonder Woman 2 or variation, may refer to:

 Wonder Woman 1984 (2020 film) sequel film to 2017 film Wonder Woman set in the DC Extended Universe (DCEU) cinematic universe
 Wonder Woman (2011 TV pilot), the failed second Wonder Woman live-action TV series
 Wonder Woman Volume II, various second volumes of various Wonder-Woman comic books, see Publication history of Wonder Woman
 Wonder Woman (Earth-Two), the Wonder Woman of the alternate universe "Earth-Two" in DC Comics universe
 Alternative versions of Wonder Woman, a successor or replacement of the original Wonder Woman, Diana Prince
 Wonder Girl, Wonder Woman's teen sidekick and potential successor

See also
 Wonder Woman (disambiguation)